The Cistern of Mocius, known in Turkish as Altımermer Çukurbostanı ("sunken garden of Altımermer"), was the largest Byzantine open-sky water reservoir built in the city of Constantinople.

Location

The cistern is located in Istanbul, in the district of Fatih (the walled city), in the quarter of Altımermer and the mahalle of Seyyid Ömer, to the northeast of the Seyyid Ömer Mosque, between Ziya Gökalp Sokak to the north and Cevdet Paşa Caddesi to the south. It lies on the highest part of the seventh hill of Istanbul, and overlooks the Marmara Sea.

History
According to the Patria of Constantinople, the construction of this cistern, which lay in the twelfth region of Constantinople, occurred under Emperor Anastasius I (r. 491–518). The name came from the important church dedicated to Saint Mocius, which was located near the southwest corner of the reservoir. The cistern, which lay just outside the Wall of Constantine, which formed the city's original landward boundary, was built to supply water to the new quarters erected between the former and the 5th-century Theodosian Walls. Writing after the Ottoman conquest of 1453, the 16th-century French traveler Pierre Gilles observed that around 1540 the reservoir was empty.  In the Ottoman period, as its Turkish name Çukurbostan ("hollow garden") betrays, the structure was used as vegetable garden, usage which remained until the end of the 20th century. As of 2014 the area is used as "Educational Park" of the Fatih district.

Description

See also
List of Roman cisterns

References

Sources

Further reading
 

Cisterns in Istanbul
Roman cisterns
Fatih